Drupa is a genus of sea snails, marine gastropod mollusks in the family Muricidae, the murex snails or rock snails. It occurs in the Indo-Pacific.

Description 
In this genus, the shell has a narrow aperture occluded by columellar and outer lip teeth.

Diet 
Drupa snails are predators that mainly feed on polychaetes but also on vermetids, sipunculids, crustaceans and fish.

Species
Species within the genus Drupa include:
 Drupa albolabris (Blainville, 1832) 
 Drupa aperta (Blainville, 1832) 
 Drupa clathrata (Lamarck, 1816)
 Drupa denticulata Houart & Vilvens, 1997
 Drupa elegans (Broderip & Sowerby, 1829)
 Drupa miticula Lamarck, 1822
 Drupa morum Röding, 1798
 Drupa ricinus (Linnaeus, 1758)
 Drupa rubusidaeus Röding, 1798
 Drupa speciosa (Dunker, 1867)

 Species brought into synonymy 
 Drupa anaxeres Duclos in Kiener, 1836: synonym of Morula (Morula) anaxares (Kiener, 1835)
 Drupa andrewsi (E. A. Smith, 1909): synonym of Morula japonica (G. B. Sowerby III, 1903)
 Drupa aspera Lamarck: synonym of Morula (Morula) aspera (Lamarck, 1816)
 Drupa biconica de Blainville: synonym of Morula (Habromorula) biconica (Blainville, 1832)
 Drupa cancellata Quoy & Gaimard: synonym of Muricodrupa fenestrata (Blainville, 1832)
 Drupa chrysostoma Deshayes: synonym of Semiricinula chrysostoma (Deshayes, 1844)
 Drupa concatenata Lamarck: synonym of Drupella rugosa (Born, 1778)
 Drupa decussata Reeve: synonym of Muricodrupa fiscella (Gmelin, 1791)
 Drupa digitata Lamarck: synonym of Drupa (Drupina) grossularia Röding, 1798
 Drupa elata Blainville: synonym of Drupella cornus (Röding, 1798)
 Drupa fiscella (Chemnitz, 1788): synonym of Muricodrupa fiscella (Gmelin, 1791)
 Drupa fusconigra Dunker: synonym of Semiricinula squamosa (Pease, 1868)
 Drupa granulata (Duclos, 1832): synonym of Morula (Morula) granulata (Duclos, 1832)
 Drupa horrida Lamarck: synonym of Drupa (Drupa) morum morum Röding, 1798
 Drupa margariticola Broderip: synonym of Ergalatax margariticola (Broderip, in Broderip & Sowerby, 1833)
 Drupa marginatra (Blainville): synonym of Semiricinula marginatra (Blainville, 1832)
 Drupa mutica Lamarck: synonym of Morula (Azumamorula) mutica (Lamarck, 1816)
 Drupa ochrostoma (de Blainville, 1832): synonym of Pascula ochrostoma (Blainville, 1832)
 Drupa reticulata: synonym of Phycothais reticulata (Quoy & Gaimard, 1833)
 Drupa spathulifera Blainville: synonym of Drupa (Ricinella) rubusidaeus Röding, 1798
 Drupa spectrum Reeve: synonym of Drupella cornus (Röding, 1798)
 Drupa spinosa Adams, 1853: synonym of Morula (Habromorula) spinosa (H. Adams & A. Adams, 1853)
 Drupa tuberculata (de Blainville, 1832): synonym of Morula (Morula) granulata (Duclos, 1832)
 Drupa undata (Chemnitz, 1795): synonym of Ergalatax margariticola (Broderip, in Broderip & Sowerby, 1833)
 Drupa violacea Schumacher: synonym of Drupa (Drupa) morum morum Röding, 1798

References

 Claremont M., Vermeij G.J., Williams S.T. & Reid D.G. (2013) Global phylogeny and new classification of the Rapaninae (Gastropoda: Muricidae), dominant molluscan predators on tropical rocky seashores. Molecular Phylogenetics and Evolution 66: 91–102.
 Claremont M., Reid D.G. & Williams S.T. (2012) Speciation and dietary specialization in Drupa, a genus of predatory marine snails (Gastropoda: Muricidae). Zoologica Scripta 41: 137-149

External links
 Röding P.F. (1798). Museum Boltenianum sive Catalogus cimeliorum e tribus regnis naturæ quæ olim collegerat Joa. Fried Bolten, M. D. p. d. per XL. annos proto physicus Hamburgensis. Pars secunda continens Conchylia sive Testacea univalvia, bivalvia & multivalvia. Trapp, Hamburg. viii, 199 pp
 Link D.H.F. (1807-1808). Beschreibung der Naturalien-Sammlung der Universität zu Rostock. Rostock: Adlers Erben